Introductory Phonology is a 2008 book by Bruce Hayes designed for an introductory course in phonology for undergraduates.

Reception
The book was reviewed by Eric Bakovic, Samuil Marusca, Lilla Magyar and Maria Gouskova.

References

External links
Introductory Phonology

2008 non-fiction books
Phonology books
Linguistics textbooks
Wiley-Blackwell books